The 11th Pan American Games were held in Havana, Cuba from August 2 to August 18, 1991.

Medals

Silver

Bronze

Women's Balance Beam: Luisa Portocarrero

Results by event

See also
 Guatemala at the 1992 Summer Olympics

Nations at the 1991 Pan American Games
Pan American Games
1991